Bromham is a village and civil parish in the Borough of Bedford in Bedfordshire, England, situated around  west of Bedford town centre.

Name
Bromham (Bruneham in Domesday) is probably the enclosed meadow on which the broom or the dyers' weed grew (at present no such flora can be found at that location).

Another theory as to the origin of the village's name is Bruna's homestead and was first recorded as Bruneham in the Domesday Book of 1086. Other variants including Bruham (1164–1302), Braham (1227), Bramham (1228), Brumham (1262–87), Brunham (1276–91), Brumbham (1276), Brynham (1276), Broham (1278), Bronham (1338), Broam (1360), Brounham (1361) and Burnham (1361). The modern spelling is first recorded in 1227.

History
The land formed part of the Barony of Bedford held by the Beauchamps. After the Battle of Evesham, in which John de Beauchamp fell fighting on the side of the barons, the manor was held for a time by Prince Edward, but afterward divided among the Beauchamp female heirs. Bromham afterward passed successively into the hands of the Mowbrays, the Latimers, the Nevilles, the Passelowes, the Wildes and the Dyves. Early in the 18th century, the manor was bought by Sir Thomas Trevor, who was afterward created Lord Trevor, and whose mother was a daughter of John Hampden, the patriot. Three of his sons succeeded to the title. One of them – the third Lord Trevor – married Sir Richard Steele's (Dick Steele) daughter; and another – the fourth Lord Trevor – inherited the Great Hampden Estate in Bucks, through his grandmother, and was created Viscount Hampden. The Trevors became connected through marriage with the Rice family (the Dynevor Rices) and at the death of the late Miss Rice Trevor the estate passed to the Wingfields.

Social 
Bromham plays host to several social events through the year, Bromfest, The Duck Race and many other well organised events.

Notable features
It has a number of notable features including a flour watermill (Bromham Mill, now open to the public), the Church of St Owen, and a medieval bridge over the River Great Ouse that, until 1986, carried the main A428 road over the river on 26 arches.

The watermill is referred to in the Domesday Book of 1086 and the Vikings navigated the Great Ouse a long time ago. The mill was extensively restored in 1980 by Warwickshire millwrights Gormley and Goodman to the extent that it was able to grind wheat for flour again for the first time that year since it ceased work in 1939. Alterations to the weir below the mill's leat shortly afterwards caused a reduction to the height of the head-race, resulting in poorer performance from the mill's impulse water-wheel.

Location
The parish is for the greater part enclosed in a bend in the Great Ouse, and it touches the parishes of Oakley, Biddenham, Kempston, Stagsden, Stevington and at its western point, Turvey. It is to the west of Bedford.

References

External links 

St Owen's Church website
Village website
Bromham Mill
Bromham section of the Victoria County History of Bedfordshire online
Bromham Baptist Church website

Villages in Bedfordshire
Populated places on the River Great Ouse
Civil parishes in Bedfordshire
Borough of Bedford